Hugh Charles Boyle (October 8, 1873 – December 22, 1950) was an American prelate of the Roman Catholic Church. He served as bishop of the Diocese of Pittsburgh in Pennsylvania from 1921 until his death in 1950.

Biography

Early life 
Hugh Boyle was born on October 8, 1873, in Johnstown, Pennsylvania, one of nine children of Charles and Anna (née Keelan) Boyle. His father was an Irish immigrant who worked as a coal miner. He received his early education at local parochial schools, and enrolled at St. Vincent College in Latrobe at age 14. During the 1889 Johnstown Flood, his father and most of his siblings drowned; only his mother and one brother survived. He began his studies for the priesthood at St. Vincent Seminary, also in Latrobe, in 1891.

Priesthood 
Boyle was ordained a priest for the Diocese of Pittsburgh by Bishop Richard Phelan on July 2, 1898. His first assignment was as a curate at St. Aloysius Parish in Wilmerding, Pennsylvania, where he remained for five years. He then served at the Cathedral of St. Paul and secretary to Bishop Regis Canevin until 1909, when he became superintendent of diocesan schools. From 1916 to 1921, he served as pastor of St. Mary Magdalene Parish in Homestead, Pennsylvania.

Bishop of Pittsburgh 
On June 16, 1921, Boyle was appointed the sixth Bishop of Pittsburgh by Pope Benedict XV. He received his episcopal consecration on June 29, 1921, from Bishop Canevin, with Bishops Philip R. McDevitt and John McCort serving as co-consecrators. 

During his 29-year tenure, he earned a reputation as one of the leading Catholic educators in the nation, and sponsored a comprehensive school-building program in the diocese, most notably asking the Brothers of the Christian Schools to establish Central Catholic High School. He was a supporter of social justice movements, such as the Catholic Radical Alliance. In 1941, he established the Catholic Workers' School in Pittsburgh.

During World War II, Boyle served as chairman of the National Catholic Welfare Council's Committee for Polish Relief. He defended the Allied bombing of Rome as a wartime necessity and praised the care that was taken in the air raids to protect the city's religious and cultural treasures. Boyle also played a prominent role in the activities of the Legion of Decency and was a member of the Episcopal Committee on Motion Pictures.

Death and legacy 
Hugh Boyle died on December 22, 1950, at Mercy Hospital in Pittsburgh, at age 77. He is buried in St. Mary Cemetery in the city's Lawrenceville neighborhood.

References

1873 births
1950 deaths
Saint Vincent College alumni
Roman Catholic bishops of Pittsburgh
20th-century Roman Catholic bishops in the United States
American Roman Catholic clergy of Irish descent
Catholics from Pennsylvania